Omphalogramma is a genus of flowering plants belonging to the family Primulaceae.

Its native range is the Himalayas to Central China and Northern Myanmar.

Species
Species:

Omphalogramma brachysiphon 
Omphalogramma burmanicum 
Omphalogramma coxii 
Omphalogramma delavayi 
Omphalogramma elegans 
Omphalogramma elwesianum 
Omphalogramma forrestii 
Omphalogramma minus 
Omphalogramma pilosum 
Omphalogramma souliei 
Omphalogramma tibeticum 
Omphalogramma vinciflorum

References

Primulaceae
Primulaceae genera